Myiophasiopsis  is a genus of tachinid flies in the family Tachinidae.

Species
Myiophasiopsis flavotegulata Townsend, 1927

Distribution
Peru.

References

Diptera of South America
Dexiinae
Tachinidae genera
Taxa named by Charles Henry Tyler Townsend
Monotypic Brachycera genera